The women's pentathlon event  at the 1996 European Athletics Indoor Championships was held on 9 March.

Results

References

Combined events at the European Athletics Indoor Championships
Pentathlon
1996 in women's athletics